Groden may refer to:

 Groden, an alternative name for a polder
 Gröden, a village in Brandenburg, Germany